Seyfabad Rural District is a rural district (dehestan) in the Central District of Khonj County, Fars Province, Iran. At the 2006 census, its population was 8,091, in 1,623 families.  The rural district has 22 villages.

References 

Rural Districts of Fars Province
Khonj County